The following is a partial list of the "D" codes for Medical Subject Headings (MeSH), as defined by the United States National Library of Medicine (NLM).

This list covers transcription factors. For other protein-related codes, see List of MeSH codes (D12.776).

Codes before these are found at List of MeSH codes (D12.776) § MeSH D12.776.926.550. Codes following these are found at List of MeSH codes (D12.776) § MeSH D12.776.947. For other MeSH codes, see List of MeSH codes.

The source for this content is the set of 2006 MeSH Trees from the NLM.

– transcription factors

– adenovirus e1a proteins

– adenovirus e1b proteins

– antennapedia homeodomain protein

– basic helix-loop-helix transcription factors

– basic helix-loop-helix leucine zipper transcription factors
 – microphthalmia-associated transcription factor
 – sterol regulatory element binding proteins
 – sterol regulatory element binding protein 1
 – sterol regulatory element binding protein 2

– hypoxia-inducible factor 1
 – aryl hydrocarbon receptor nuclear translocator
 – hypoxia-inducible factor 1, alpha subunit

– myogenic regulatory factors
 – myod protein
 – myogenic regulatory factor 5
 – myogenin

– twist transcription factor

– upstream stimulatory factors

– basic-leucine zipper transcription factors

– activating transcription factors
 – activating transcription factor 1
 – activating transcription factor 2
 – activating transcription factor 3
 – activating transcription factor 4
 – activating transcription factor 6

– basic helix-loop-helix leucine zipper transcription factors
 – microphthalmia-associated transcription factor
 – sterol regulatory element binding proteins
 – sterol regulatory element binding protein 1
 – sterol regulatory element binding protein 2

– CCAAT-enhancer-binding proteins
 – CCAAT-binding factor
 – CCAAT-enhancer-binding protein-alpha
 – CCAAT-enhancer-binding protein-beta
 – CCAAT-enhancer-binding protein-delta
 – transcription factor chop
 – Y box binding protein 1

– cyclic amp response element-binding protein

– cyclic amp response element-binding protein a

– cyclic amp response element modulator

– fos-related antigen-2

– interferon regulatory factor-1

– maf transcription factors
 – maf transcription factors, large
 – mafb transcription factor
 – oncogene protein v-maf
 – proto-oncogene proteins c-maf
 – maf transcription factors, small
 – maff transcription factor
 – mafg transcription factor
 – mafk transcription factor

– nf-e2 transcription factor
 – maf transcription factors, small
 – maff transcription factor
 – mafg transcription factor
 – mafk transcription factor
 – nf-e2 transcription factor, p45 subunit

– nf-e2-related factor 1

– nf-e2-related factor 2

– proto-oncogene proteins c-fos

– proto-oncogene proteins c-jun

– transcription factor ap-1

– beta catenin

– brca1 protein

– core binding factors

– core binding factor alpha subunits
 – core binding factor alpha 1 subunit
 – core binding factor alpha 2 subunit
 – core binding factor alpha 3 subunit

– core binding factor beta subunit

– cyclic amp receptor protein

– e2f transcription factors

– e2f1 transcription factor

– e2f2 transcription factor

– e2f3 transcription factor

– e2f4 transcription factor

– e2f5 transcription factor

– e2f6 transcription factor

– e2f7 transcription factor

– early growth response transcription factors

– early growth response protein 1

– early growth response protein 2

– early growth response protein 3

– erythroid-specific dna-binding factors

– gata1 transcription factor

– gata2 transcription factor

– gata3 transcription factor

– nf-e2 transcription factor
 – maf transcription factors, small
 – maff transcription factor
 – mafg transcription factor
 – mafk transcription factor
 – nf-e2 transcription factor, p45 subunit

– YY1 transcription factor

– fushi tarazu transcription factors

– g-box binding factors

– gata transcription factors

– gata1 transcription factor

– gata2 transcription factor

– gata3 transcription factor

– gata4 transcription factor

– gata5 transcription factor

– gata6 transcription factor

– goosecoid protein

– hepatocyte nuclear factors

– hepatocyte nuclear factor 1
 – hepatocyte nuclear factor 1-alpha
 – hepatocyte nuclear factor 1-beta

– hepatocyte nuclear factor 3-alpha

– hepatocyte nuclear factor 3-beta

– hepatocyte nuclear factor 3-gamma

– hepatocyte nuclear factor 4

– hepatocyte nuclear factor 6

– host cell factor c1

– i-kappa b proteins

– immunoglobulin j recombination signal sequence-binding protein

– inhibitor of differentiation proteins

– inhibitor of differentiation protein 1

– inhibitor of differentiation protein 2

– interferon regulatory factors

– interferon regulatory factor-1

– interferon regulatory factor-2

– interferon regulatory factor-3

– interferon regulatory factor-7

– interferon-stimulated gene factor 3, gamma subunit

– interferon-stimulated gene factor 3

– interferon-stimulated gene factor 3, alpha subunit
 – stat1 transcription factor
 – stat2 transcription factor

– interferon-stimulated gene factor 3, gamma subunit

– kruppel-like transcription factors

– ikaros transcription factor

– sp transcription factors
 – sp1 transcription factor
 – sp2 transcription factor
 – sp3 transcription factor
 – sp4 transcription factor

– leucine-responsive regulatory protein

– mads domain proteins

– agamous protein, arabidopsis

– deficiens protein

– MCM1 protein

– serum response factor

– msx1 transcription factor

– myeloid-lymphoid leukemia protein

– nf-kappa b

– nf-kappa b p50 subunit

– nf-kappa b p52 subunit

– transcription factor rela

– transcription factor relb

– nfatc transcription factors

– nfi transcription factors

– nuclear factor 90 proteins

– nuclear factor 45 protein

– nuclear receptor coactivator 2

– nuclear respiratory factors

– ga-binding protein transcription factor

– nuclear respiratory factor 1

– onecut transcription factors

– hepatocyte nuclear factor 6

– otx transcription factors

– p300-CBP coactivator family

– e1a-associated p300 protein

– paired box transcription factors

– b-cell-specific activator protein

– PAX2 transcription factor

– PAX7 transcription factor

– PAX9 transcription factor

– peroxisome proliferator-activated receptors

– PPAR-alpha

– PPAR-beta

– PPAR-delta

– PPAR-gamma

– POU domain factors

– octamer transcription factors
 – octamer transcription factor-1
 – octamer transcription factor-2
 – octamer transcription factor-3
 – octamer transcription factor-6

– transcription factor brn-3
 – transcription factor brn-3a
 – transcription factor brn-3b
 – transcription factor brn-3c

– transcription factor pit-1

– proto-oncogene proteins c-bcl-6

– proto-oncogene proteins c-ets

– proto-oncogene protein c-ets-1

– proto-oncogene protein c-ets-2

– proto-oncogene protein c-fli-1

– ternary complex factors
 – ets-domain protein elk-1
 – ets-domain protein elk-4

– proto-oncogene proteins c-myb

– proto-oncogene proteins c-rel

– receptors, aryl hydrocarbon

– receptors, calcitriol

– receptors, notch

– receptor, notch1

– receptor, notch2

– receptors, retinoic acid

– retinoid X receptors
 – retinoid X receptor alpha
 – retinoid X receptor beta
 – retinoid X receptor gamma

– receptors, steroid

– coup transcription factors
 – coup transcription factor i
 – coup transcription factor ii

– receptors, androgen

– receptors, estrogen
 – estrogen receptor alpha
 – estrogen receptor beta
 – receptors, estradiol

– receptors, glucocorticoid

– receptors, mineralocorticoid
 – receptors, aldosterone

– receptors, progesterone

– receptors, thyroid hormone

– thyroid hormone receptors alpha

– thyroid hormone receptors beta

– repressor proteins

– arac transcription factor

– coup transcription factor ii

– rho factor

– sex-determining region y protein

– sigma factor

– smad proteins

– smad proteins, receptor-regulated
 – smad1 protein
 – smad2 protein
 – smad3 protein
 – smad5 protein
 – smad8 protein

– smad4 protein

– smad6 protein

– stat transcription factors

– stat1 transcription factor

– stat2 transcription factor

– stat3 transcription factor

– stat4 transcription factor

– stat5 transcription factor

– stat6 transcription factor

– t-box domain proteins

– tcf transcription factors

– lymphoid enhancer-binding factor 1

– t cell transcription factor 1

– trans-activators

– herpes simplex virus protein vmw65

– transcription factor ap-2

– transcription factor dp1

– transcription factors, general

– pol1 transcription initiation complex proteins

– tata-binding protein associated factors

– tata-box binding protein

– tata box binding protein-like proteins

– transcription factors, tfii
 – transcription factor tfiia
 – transcription factor tfiib
 – transcription factor tfiid
 – tata-box binding protein
 – transcription factor tfiih
 – xeroderma pigmentosum group d protein

– transcription factors, tfiii
 – transcription factor tfiiia
 – transcription factor tfiiib

– transcriptional elongation factors

– positive transcriptional elongation factor b
 – cyclin-dependent kinase 9

– tristetraprolin

– winged-helix transcription factors

– forkhead transcription factors
 – hepatocyte nuclear factor 3-alpha
 – hepatocyte nuclear factor 3-beta
 – hepatocyte nuclear factor 3-gamma

The list continues at List of MeSH codes (D12.776) § MeSH D12.776.947.

D12.776.930